Turgut Özatay (30 December 1927 – 26 June 2002) was a Turkish film actor. He appeared in 225 films between 1952 and 1998. He starred in the film The Broken Pots, which was entered into the 11th Berlin International Film Festival.

Selected filmography
 The Broken Pots (1960)
 Love and Grudge (1964)
Hakanlar Çarpışıyor (1977)
 Korkusuz Korkak (1979)

References

External links

1927 births
2002 deaths
Turkish male film actors
Deaths from lung cancer in Turkey
Actors from İzmir
20th-century Turkish male actors
Burials at Feriköy Cemetery